Hammarby is a part of southern Stockholm, located southeast of Södermalm, east of Årsta and Globen, and west of Nacka. Hammarby is known for the sports club Hammarby IF and the new development Hammarby Sjöstad.

See also
Södra Länken
Tvärbanan

Metropolitan Stockholm
Streetcar suburbs